Maxlei dos Santos Luzia or simply Max (27 February 1975 – 26 July 2017), was a Brazilian goalkeeper.

Death
In June 2017, Max was the victim of an attempted robbery. Bandits hit their car in the city of Duque de Caxias, in the Baixada Fluminense, with the intention of taking the vehicle, causing a serious accident. The former goalkeeper suffered a fractured right hand and a cerebral edema. At the Hospital da Lagoa, in the city of Rio de Janeiro, Max had his clinical condition aggravated. The doctors noticed a rare autoimmune disease in the athlete. On July 25 he failed to respond to neurological tests, and the next day brain death was confirmed. It is unclear whether his death is the result of the injuries suffered during the robbery or due to the autoimmune disease.

Honours 
Botafogo
 Taça Guanabara: 2006
 Campeonato Carioca: 2006
 Taça Rio: 2007

Joinville
 Copa Santa Catarina: 2011 
 Série C do Brasileiro: 2011

 Boa Esporte
 Taça Minas Gerais: 2012

References

External links
canalbotafogo.com
sambafoot.com
CBF

1975 births
2017 deaths
Brazilian footballers
Associação Atlética Portuguesa (RJ) players
Bangu Atlético Clube players
Friburguense Atlético Clube players
America Football Club (RJ) players
Botafogo de Futebol e Regatas players
Vila Nova Futebol Clube players
Itumbiara Esporte Clube players
Joinville Esporte Clube players
Association football goalkeepers
Neurological disease deaths in Rio de Janeiro (state)
Deaths from cerebral edema
Footballers from Rio de Janeiro (city)